Isaac Newton Arnold (November 30, 1815 – April 24, 1884) was an American attorney, politician, and biographer who made his career in Chicago. He served two terms in the United States House of Representatives (1860–1864) and in 1864 introduced the first resolution in Congress proposing a constitutional amendment to abolish slavery in the United States. After returning to Chicago in 1866, he practiced law and wrote biographies of Abraham Lincoln and Benedict Arnold.

Early life, education, and early career
Born in Hartwick, New York, Arnold was the son of Sophia M. and Dr. George Washington Arnold, natives of Rhode Island who had migrated to New York after the Revolutionary War. He attended common schools, followed by the Hartwick Seminary in 1831-1832. There he joined the Philophronean Society, who debated the issues of the day, including the abolition of slavery.

From 1832-1835, Arnold taught school in Otsego County. He studied law with Richard Cooper, and later with Judge E. B. Morehouse of Cooperstown. Admitted to the bar in 1835 at the age of 20, Arnold became a partner of Morehouse.

Migration west
Excited by other possibilities, in 1836 Arnold moved to Chicago, a small village developing as population migrated west after completion of the Erie Canal in New York, which connected Great Lakes shipping to the port of New York City. He became a law partner of Mahlon D. Ogden. When Chicago was incorporated the following year, in 1837 Ogden was elected mayor and Arnold city clerk.  He left office to attend to his law practice, through which he got to know and befriend fellow Illinois lawyer Abraham Lincoln.

In 1842, Arnold was elected to the Illinois House of Representatives as a Democrat and served three terms. He was a Democratic presidential elector in 1844.

Inspired by the issue of abolishing slavery, Arnold was a delegate to the national Free Soil Convention in 1848. He left the Democrats to become an organizer of the Free Soil Party in Illinois. Arnold served one term in the state house from 1855-56 under the Free Soil banner.

In 1860 he joined the Republican Party and won election to the U.S. House that year. He was reelected in 1862. A strong supporter of President Lincoln during his tenure in Congress, Arnold pushed emancipation in the territories and nation. He defended Lincoln against critics, including within his party.

In March 1862, during the American Civil War, Arnold introduced a bill to abolish slavery in U.S. territories, which became law in June 1862. In February 1864, he introduced a resolution for a constitutional amendment to abolish slavery throughout the United States, saying:

He was the first Congressman to introduce a resolution to abolish slavery. In 1865 the Thirteenth Amendment to the United States Constitution was ratified and slavery was ended.

In 1864 Arnold faced a strong challenge from the Democrat John L. Scripps, the postmaster in Chicago, whose appointment he had opposed. By then, Scripps controlled a large field of patronage because of his position. In addition, German Americans made up 25 percent of Arnold's constituents in 1860, and they were unhappy with him about continued drafts of men into the Army. Arnold withdrew from the race in favor of the Republican John Wentworth, the popular former mayor. Wentworth won the seat.

Arnold accepted a presidential appointment from Lincoln as the Sixth Auditor of the Treasury Department.

In 1866, Arnold left Washington and returned to his law practice in Chicago.

Literary career
Arnold was rapidly working on a book about Lincoln. He published The History of Abraham Lincoln and the Overthrow of Slavery in 1867. This was considered a general history that suffered from not having sufficient research.

He did years of research on an earlier historical figure, writing a biography entitled The Life of Benedict Arnold: His Patriotism and His Treason (1880).

Dismayed by contemporary accounts of Lincoln by William H. Herndon and Ward Hill Lamon, Arnold wrote a new biography, The Life of Lincoln (1884), to concentrate on the years of his presidency and refute some of the personal controversial accounts. It was well received at the time, reviewed by the press in the US and Great Britain and, in the late 1940s, it was described as "one of the best of the early biographies." It was reprinted in 1994.

Arnold died April 24, 1884, and was buried at Graceland Cemetery in Chicago.

Works

References

Sources

Allen Johnson and Dumas Malone, eds., Dictionary of American Biography, 20 vols. and supplements (New York: Charles Scribner's Sons, 1928–), 1:368–69''

External links

 
 
Isaac N. Arnold, The Life of Benedict Arnold, reprint 1905, full text available at Google Books

1815 births
1884 deaths
People from Hartwick, New York
Illinois Democrats
Illinois Free Soilers
Members of the Illinois House of Representatives
New York (state) lawyers
Illinois lawyers
American biographers
American male biographers
Burials at Graceland Cemetery (Chicago)
Politicians from Chicago
Republican Party members of the United States House of Representatives from Illinois
19th-century American politicians
Historians from New York (state)
Historians from Illinois
19th-century American lawyers